Warwick Perrins Selvey (3 December 1939 – 16 August 2018) was an Australian Olympic athlete who competed in the shot put and discus events.

Selvey won a total of 18 Australian Championships in Athletics between 1960 and 1973 which is a record for male athletes.

He represented Australia at two Olympic Games, making the final of the shot and discus in the 1960 Rome Games.  At his only Commonwealth Games, in 1962, he won the discus and finished fourth in the shot put.

He died in Sakhon Nakhon Hospital in Thailand of Cardiac Arrest, following Hip Replacement Surgery.

Statistics

Personal Bests

See also
 Australian athletics champions

References

1939 births
2018 deaths
Australian male shot putters
Australian male discus throwers
Athletes (track and field) at the 1960 Summer Olympics
Athletes (track and field) at the 1964 Summer Olympics
Olympic athletes of Australia
Athletes (track and field) at the 1962 British Empire and Commonwealth Games
Commonwealth Games gold medallists for Australia
Commonwealth Games medallists in athletics
Medallists at the 1962 British Empire and Commonwealth Games